Crack cocaine, commonly known simply as crack, and also known as rock, is a free base form of the stimulant cocaine that can be smoked. Crack offers a short, intense high to smokers. The Manual of Adolescent Substance Abuse Treatment calls it the most addictive form of cocaine.

Crack cocaine first saw widespread use as a recreational drug in primarily impoverished neighborhoods in New York City, Philadelphia, Baltimore, Washington, D.C., Los Angeles, San Francisco, and Miami in late 1984 and 1985; this rapid increase in use and availability was named the "crack epidemic", which began to wane in the 1990s. The use of another highly addictive stimulant drug, crystal meth, ballooned between 1994 and 2004.

Physical and chemical properties
Purer forms of crack resemble off-white, jagged-edged "rocks" of a hard, brittle plastic, with a slightly higher density than candle wax. Like cocaine in other forms, crack rock acts as a local anesthetic, numbing the tongue or mouth only where directly placed. Purer forms of crack will sink in water or melt at the edges when near a flame (crack vaporizes at 90 °C, 194 °F).

Crack cocaine sold on the streets may be adulterated (or "cut") with other substances mimicking the appearance of crack to increase bulk. Use of toxic adulterants such as levamisole, a drug used to treat parasitic worm infections, has been documented.

Synthesis

Sodium bicarbonate (NaHCO3, common baking soda) is a base used in the preparation of crack, although other weak bases may substitute for it. The net reaction when using sodium bicarbonate is
Coc-H+Cl− + NaHCO3 → Coc + H2O + CO2 + NaCl

With ammonium bicarbonate:

Coc-H+Cl− + NH4HCO3 → Coc + NH4Cl + CO2 + H2O

With ammonium carbonate:

2(Coc-H+Cl−) + (NH4)2CO3 → 2 Coc + 2 NH4Cl + CO2 + H2O

Crack cocaine is frequently purchased already in rock form, although it is not uncommon for some users to "wash up" or "cook" powder cocaine into crack themselves. This process is frequently done with baking soda (sodium bicarbonate), water, and a spoon. Once mixed and heated, the bicarbonate reacts with the hydrochloride of the powder cocaine, forming free base cocaine and carbonic acid (H2CO3) in a reversible acid-base reaction. The heating accelerates the degradation of carbonic acid into carbon dioxide (CO2) and water. Loss of CO2 prevents the reaction from reversing back to cocaine hydrochloride. Free base cocaine separates as an oily layer, floating on the top of the now leftover aqueous phase. It is at this point that the oil is picked up rapidly, usually with a pin or long thin object. This pulls the oil up and spins it, allowing air to set and dry the oil, and allows the maker to roll the oil into the rock-like shape.

Crack vaporizes near temperature 90 °C (194 °F), much lower than the cocaine hydrochloride melting point of 190 °C (374 °F). Whereas cocaine hydrochloride cannot be smoked (burns with no effect), crack cocaine when smoked allows for quick absorption into the blood stream, and reaches the brain in eight seconds.

Crack cocaine can also be injected intravenously with the same effect as powder cocaine. However, whereas powder cocaine dissolves in water, crack must be dissolved in an acidic solution such as lemon juice (containing citric acid) or white vinegar (containing acetic acid), a process that effectively reverses the original conversion of powder cocaine to crack. Harm reduction and public health agencies may distribute packets of citric acid or ascorbic acid (Vitamin C) for this purpose.

Recreational use

Crack cocaine is commonly used as a recreational drug. Effects of crack cocaine include euphoria, supreme confidence, loss of appetite, insomnia, alertness, increased energy, a craving for more cocaine,
and potential paranoia (ending after use).
Its initial effect is to release a large amount of dopamine, a brain chemical inducing feelings of euphoria. The high usually lasts from 5 to 10 minutes, after which time dopamine levels in the brain plummet, leaving the user feeling depressed and low. When (powder) cocaine is dissolved and injected, the absorption into the bloodstream is at least as rapid as the absorption of the drug which occurs when crack cocaine is smoked, and similar euphoria may be experienced.

Adverse effects

Physiological

The short-term physiological effects of cocaine include constricted blood vessels, dilated pupils, and increased temperature, heart rate, and blood pressure. Some users of cocaine report feelings of restlessness, irritability, and anxiety. In rare instances, sudden death can occur on the first use of cocaine or unexpectedly thereafter. Cocaine-related deaths are often a result of cardiac arrest or seizures followed by respiratory arrest.

Like other forms of cocaine, smoking crack can increase heart rate and blood pressure, leading to long-term cardiovascular problems. Some research suggests that smoking crack or free base cocaine has additional health risks compared to other methods of taking cocaine. Many of these issues relate specifically to the release of methylecgonidine and its effect on the heart, lungs, and liver.

Toxic adulterants: Many substances may have been added to expand the weight and volume of a batch, while still appearing to be pure crack. Occasionally, highly toxic substances are used, with a range of corresponding short and long-term health risks. Adulterants used with crack and cocaine include milk powder, sugars such as glucose, starch, caffeine, lidocaine, benzocaine, paracetamol, amphetamine, scopolamine and strychnine.
Smoking problems: Any route of administration poses its own set of health risks; in the case of crack cocaine, smoking tends to be more harmful than other routes. Crack users tend to smoke the drug because that has a higher bioavailability than other routes typically used for drugs of abuse such as Insufflation. Therefore, crack pipes are generally very short, to minimize the time between evaporating and ingestion (thereby minimizing loss of potency). Having a very hot pipe pressed against the lips often causes cracked and blistered lips, colloquially known as "crack lip". The use of "convenience store crack pipes"—glass tubes which originally contained small artificial roses—may contribute to this condition. These 4-inch (10-cm) pipes are not durable and will quickly develop breaks; users may continue to use the pipe even though it has been broken to a shorter length. The hot pipe might burn the lips, tongue, or fingers, especially when passed between people who take hits in rapid succession, causing the short pipe to reach higher temperatures than if used by one person alone.
Pure or large doses: Because the quality of crack can vary greatly, some people might smoke larger amounts of diluted crack, unaware that a similar amount of a new batch of purer crack could cause an overdose. This can trigger heart problems or cause unconsciousness.
Pathogens on pipes: When pipes are shared, bacteria or viruses can be transferred from person to person.

Crack cocaine causes DNA damage in multiple organs of rats and mice.

Crack lung
In crack users, acute respiratory symptoms have been reported, sometimes termed "crack lung". Symptoms include fever, coughing up blood and difficulty breathing. In the 48-hour period after use, people with these symptoms have also had associated radiographic findings on chest X-ray of fluid in the lungs (pulmonary edema), interstitial pneumonia, diffuse alveolar hemorrhage, and eosinophil infiltration.

Psychological
Stimulant drug abuse (particularly amphetamine and cocaine) can lead to delusional parasitosis (aka Ekbom's Syndrome: a mistaken belief they are infested with parasites). For example, excessive cocaine use can lead to formication, nicknamed "cocaine bugs" or "coke bugs", where the affected people believe they have, or feel, parasites crawling under their skin (similar delusions may also be associated with high fever or in connection with alcohol withdrawal, sometimes accompanied by visual hallucinations of insects—see delirium tremens).

People experiencing these hallucinations might scratch themselves to the extent of serious skin damage and bleeding, especially when they are delirious.

Paranoia and anxiety are among the most common psychological symptoms of crack cocaine use. Psychosis is more closely associated with smoking crack cocaine than intranasal and intravenous use.

Pregnancy and nursing

Crack baby is a term for a child born to a mother who used crack cocaine during her pregnancy. The threat that cocaine use during pregnancy poses to the fetus is now considered exaggerated. Studies show that prenatal cocaine exposure (independent of other effects such as, for example, alcohol, tobacco, or physical environment) has no appreciable effect on childhood growth and development.
However, the official opinion of the National Institute on Drug Abuse of the United States warns about health risks while cautioning against stereotyping:

There are also warnings about the threat of breastfeeding: The March of Dimes said "it is likely that cocaine will reach the baby through breast milk," and advises the following regarding cocaine use during pregnancy:

Reinforcement disorders

Tolerance
An appreciable tolerance to cocaine's high may develop, with many addicts reporting that they seek but fail to achieve as much pleasure as they did from their first experience. Some users will frequently increase their doses to intensify and prolong the euphoric effects. While tolerance to the high can occur, users might also become more sensitive (drug sensitization) to cocaine's local anesthetic (painkilling) and convulsant (seizure-inducing) effects, without increasing the dose taken; this increased sensitivity may explain some deaths occurring after apparent low doses of cocaine.

Addiction

Crack cocaine is popularly thought to be the most addictive form of cocaine. However, this claim has been contested: Morgan and Zimmer wrote that available data indicated that "smoking cocaine by itself does not increase markedly the likelihood of dependence ... The claim that cocaine is much more addictive when smoked must be reexamined." They argued that cocaine users who are already prone to abuse are most likely to "move toward a more efficient mode of ingestion" (that is, smoking).

The intense desire to recapture the initial high is what is so addictive for many users. On the other hand, Reinarman et al. wrote that the nature of crack addiction depends on the social context in which it is used and the psychological characteristics of users, pointing out that many heavy crack users can go for days or weeks without using the drug.

Overdose

A typical response among users is to have another hit of the drug; however, the levels of dopamine in the brain take a long time to replenish themselves, and each hit taken in rapid succession leads to progressively less intense highs. Nonetheless, a person might binge for 3 or more days without sleep, while inhaling hits from a pipe.

Use of cocaine in a binge, during which the drug is taken repeatedly and at increasingly high doses, leads to a state of increasing irritability, restlessness, and paranoia. This may result in full-blown paranoid psychosis, in which the individual loses touch with reality and experiences auditory hallucinations.

Large amounts of crack cocaine (several hundred milligrams or more) intensify the user's high, but may also lead to bizarre, erratic, and violent behavior. Large amounts can induce tremors, vertigo, muscle twitches, paranoia, or, with repeated doses, a toxic reaction closely resembling amphetamine poisoning.

Society and culture

Synonyms 
Synonyms used to refer to crack cocaine include atari; base; bazooka; beamers; beemers; bebe; bee-bee; berry; bing; bolo; bomb; boulder; boulders; butter; caine; cane; Casper; Casper the ghost; cavvy; chemical; chewies; cloud; cloud nine; crills; crunch and munch; dip; famous dimes; fan; fish scale; fries; fry; glo; golfball; gravel; grit; hail; hamburger; helper; hubba; ice cube; kangaroo; kibbles and bits; kibbles; krills; lightem; paste; patico; pebbles; pee wee; pony; raw; ready; ready rocks; redi rocks; roca; rock; rooster; rox; Roxanne; scud; Scotty; scramble; scruples; seven-up; sherm; sherms; sleet; snowballs; stones; teeth; tension; top gun; tweak; ultimate; wash; white cloud; work; yahoo; yale; yay; yayoo; yeah-O; yeyo; yeo; and yuck.

Drug combinations 
Crack cocaine may be combined with amphetamine ("croak"); tobacco ("coolie"); marijuana ("buddha"; "caviar"; "chronic"; "cocoa puffs"; "fry daddy"; "gimmie"; "gremmie"; "juice"; "primo"; "torpedo"; "turbo"; "woolie"; "woola"); heroin ("moon rock"); and phencyclidine ("clicker"; "p-funk"; "spacebase").

Consumption 
Crack smoking ("hitting the pipe"; "puffing"; "beaming up (to Scotty)") is commonly performed with utensils such as pipes ("bowl"; "devil's dick"; "glass dick"; "horn"; "Uzi"); improvised pipes made from a plastic bottle ("Masarati"); water pipes ("bong"; "hubbly-bubbly"); and laboratory pipettes ("demo").

Legal status

Cocaine is listed as a Schedule I drug in the United Nations 1961 Single Convention on Narcotic Drugs, making it illegal for non-state-sanctioned production, manufacture, export, import, distribution, trade, use and possession. In most states (except in the United States) crack falls under the same category as cocaine.

Australia
In Australia, crack falls under the same category as cocaine, which is listed as a Schedule 8 controlled drug, indicating that any substances and preparations for therapeutic use under this category have a high potential for abuse and addiction. It is permitted for some medical use but is otherwise outlawed.

Canada
As a Schedule I substance under the Controlled Drugs and Substances Act, crack is not differentiated from cocaine and other coca products. However, the court may weigh the socio-economic factors of crack usage in sentencing. As a guideline, Schedule I drugs carry a maximum 7-year prison sentence for possession for an indictable offense and up to life imprisonment for trafficking and production. A summary conviction on possession carries a $1000–$2000 fine and/or 6 months to a year imprisonment.

United States
In the United States, cocaine is a Schedule II drug under the Controlled Substances Act, indicating that it has a high abuse potential but also carries a medicinal purpose. Under the Controlled Substances Act, crack and cocaine are considered the same drug.

The Anti-Drug Abuse Act of 1986 increased penalties for crack cocaine possession and usage. It mandated a mandatory minimum sentence of five years without parole for possession of five grams of crack; to receive the same sentence with powder cocaine one had to have 500 grams.

Europe
In the United Kingdom, crack is a Class A drug under the Misuse of Drugs Act 1971. In the Netherlands it is a List 1 drug of the Opium Law.

Political scandals 
Rob Ford, the 64th mayor of Toronto, was filmed smoking crack while he was in office. Marion Barry, Mayor of Washington D.C., was filmed smoking crack in 1990 in a sting operation.

See also

 Smoke Works Injection Alternatives
 CIA involvement in Contra cocaine trafficking
 Cocaine paste ("paco")
 Structurally related chemicals: proparacaine, tetracaine, lidocaine, procaine, hexylcaine, bupivacaine, benoxinate, mepivacaine, prilocaine, etidocaine, benzocaine, chloroprocaine, propoxycaine, dyclonine, dibucaine, and pramoxine.

References

Further reading
 Cooper, Edith Fairman, [ The emergence of crack cocaine abuse], Nova Publishers, 2002

Cocaine
Drug culture
American inventions